The United States Army Pacific (USARPAC) is an Army Service Component Command (ASCC) designated by the Secretary of the Army (SECARMY); it may also serve as a Joint Task Force headquarters. It is the army component unit of the United States Indo-Pacific Command, and its mission is to support the Commander, United States Indo-Pacific Command. The main areas that this command has jurisdiction in include Alaska, Hawaii, the Pacific Ocean, Japan, and South Korea. It also performs missions in Southeast Asia, in the countries stretching from the Philippines all the way to Bangladesh and India. United States Forces Korea (USFK) has had operational command and control of US Forces in Korea since January 2012, and USARPAC headquarters oversees the manning, training, and equipping of US Army forces assigned to USFK.

However, subordinate units of this command sometimes perform humanitarian missions in places such as Haiti, Cuba, and the Middle East.

History
USARPAC traces its lineage back to 1898 when the United States became a major power in the Pacific. In 1921 Fort Shafter became the headquarters for the Hawaiian Department. When the United States entered World War II, the Hawaiian Department became subordinate to the Commander-in-Chief, Pacific Ocean Areas.

History of designations
Throughout its history the command was designated:

 US Army Forces, Central Pacific Area (1943–44)
 US Army Forces, Pacific Ocean Areas (1944–45)
 US Army Forces, Middle Pacific (1945–47)
 US Army, Pacific (1947–1974)
 US Army Western Command (1979–1990)
 United States Army Pacific (1990–present)

Historical summary
During the Korean War, USARPAC provided combat forces, training, and logistics.

During the Vietnam War, the command provided the same support to United States Army Vietnam. After the war the Army cut its presence in the region as there was no longer a need for such a large number of combat forces in the Pacific. Subsequently, USARPAC was eliminated as a component command and Army forces in Korea and Japan became separate major commands. In Hawaii, USARPAC headquarters was superseded by US Army Support Command Hawaii (USASCH) and a Department of the Army field operating agency, US Army CINCPAC Support Group.

In 1979 the Army established US Army Western Command (WESTCOM) as a major command and the Army component of US Pacific Command. WESTCOM took command of Army forces in Hawaii. In 1989 it added United States Army Alaska and in 1990 United States Army, Japan. In 1990 WESTCOM was renamed USARPAC. USARPAC has sent forces on multiple humanitarian missions, disaster relief, and defense support of civil authorities.

In October 2000 the headquarters reorganized as a multi-component Army service component command.

Since 9/11, the command plays a major role in the homeland defense of the United States. The command has also sent soldiers in support of the Global War on Terrorism to fill operational gaps.

The command insignia was designed in 1944. It depicts the axis of advance of U.S. forces across the pacific.

Commander's responsibilities
 Responsible to SECARMY for execution of 10 USC § 3013(b) responsibilities
 Admins and supports army units assigned or attached to United States Indo-Pacific Command
 Reports to the Commander, United States Indo-Pacific Command

Current structure

  Army Pacific, Fort Shafter (HI)
 Eighth United States Army, Yongsan Garrison (South Korea)
 2nd Infantry Division, Camp Humphreys (South Korea)
 19th Expeditionary Sustainment Command, Daegu (South Korea)
 I Corps, Joint Base Lewis–McChord (WA)
 7th Infantry Division, Joint Base Lewis–McChord (WA)
 25th Infantry Division, Schofield Barracks (HI)
 11th Airborne Division, Fort Richardson (AK)
 United States Army Japan, Camp Zama (Japan)
 593rd Expeditionary Sustainment Command, Joint Base Lewis–McChord (WA)
 94th Army Air and Missile Defense Command, Fort Shafter
 8th Theater Sustainment Command, Schofield Barracks
 8th Military Police Brigade, Schofield Barracks
 130th Engineer Brigade, Schofield Barracks
 311th Signal Command (Theater) (Pacific)
 1st Signal Brigade, Seoul, South Korea
 516th Signal Brigade, Fort Shafter
 18th Medical Command, Fort Shafter
 9th Mission Support Command, Fort Shafter, part of US Army Reserve
 196th Infantry Brigade, Fort Shafter, part of US Army Reserve
 500th Military Intelligence Brigade, Schofield Barracks, part of Army Intelligence and Security Command
 5th Battlefield Coordination Detachment, Joint Base Pearl Harbor–Hickam

Former units include the U.S. Army Chemical Activity, Pacific, at Johnston Atoll, which traced some of its history to the 267th Chemical Company and the Project 112 biological warfare defense experiments. This became the Johnston Atoll Chemical Agent Disposal System, which was finally deactivated in 2001.

Commanders

Command Group 2022
Source:
Commanding General: General Charles A. Flynn
Deputy Commanding General: Lieutenant General James B. Jarrard
Deputy Commanding General – North: Major General Chris Smith
Deputy Commanding General, Army National Guard: Major General Reginald G. Neal
Deputy Commanding General, Army Reserve: Brigadier General Timothy D. Connelly
Chief of Staff: Major General Peter N. Benchoff
Command Sergeant Major: Command Sergeant Major Scott A. Brzak

References

External links

 Government
 

 Lineage and Honors Information at the U.S. Army Center of Military History
 General information
 

1945 establishments in Hawaii
Military units and formations in Hawaii
Military units and formations established in 1945
Military units and formations of the United States in the Cold War
Organizations based in Hawaii
Pacific